South Newbury is an unincorporated community in the town of Newbury in Merrimack County, New Hampshire, United States. Route 103 continues east to the towns of Bradford and Warner.

South Newbury has a separate ZIP code (03272) from the rest of the town of Newbury.

References

Unincorporated communities in Merrimack County, New Hampshire
Unincorporated communities in New Hampshire
Newbury, New Hampshire